Paris is a surname. Notable people with the surname include:

 Aimé Paris (1798–1866), French music educator and stenographer
 Ashley Paris (born 1987), Women's National Basketball Association player 
 Barry Paris (born 1948), American author
 Blanca París de Oddone (1925-2008), Uruguayan historian
 Bubba Paris (born 1960), American football player
 Courtney Paris (born 1987), Women's National Basketball Association player
 Dominik Paris (born 1989), Italian ski racer
 Drew Paris (born 1988), Canadian ice hockey player
 Elizabeth Crewson Paris, United States Tax Court judge
 Enrique Paris (born 1948), Chilean physician and politician
 François-Edmond Pâris (1806–1893), French admiral
 Gaston Paris (1839–1903), French writer and linguist
 Gaston Paris (1905-1964) French photographer
 Giuseppe Paris (1895-1968), Italian National Olympic Gold Medal Gymnast
 Hotman Paris (born 1959), Indonesian lawyer
 Jackie Paris (1926–2004), American jazz singer and guitarist
 Jasmin Paris (born 1983), British fell running champion, daughter of Jeff Paris (mathematician)
 Jeff Paris (mathematician) (born 1944), British mathematician, father of Jasmin Paris
 Jeff Paris (musician), American vocalist, keyboardist and guitarist
 Jerry Paris (1925–1986), American actor and Director
 Joel Paris (born 1993), Australian cricket
 John Paris, Jr. (b. 1946), Canadian hockey coach
 John Ayrton Paris (1785–1856), physician
 Kelly Paris (1957–2019), American basketball player
 Lucius Domitius Paris (died 67 AD), actor in Rome under the emperor Nero
 Maria Antonia Paris (1813–1885), Catholic nun
 Matthew Paris (1200–1259), English monk and historian
 Pierre-Adrien Pâris (1745–1819), French architect
 Richard Bruce Paris (1946–2022), British mathematician
 Ronald Paris (1933–2021), German painter and graphic artist
 Ryan Paris (born 1953), Italian singer
 Reverend Samuel Parris (1653-1720), minister at Salem during the Salem witch trials
 Sarina Paris (born 1973), Canadian pop vocalist
 Taylor Paris (born 1992), Canadian rugby player
 Twila Paris (born 1958), female Christian singer
 Wilbur de Paris (1900-1973), American jazz trombonist 
 William de Paris ( XIV century), English Member of Parliament

Fictional characters
 Owen Paris, on the television series Star Trek: Voyager and father of Tom Paris
 Tom Paris, on the television series Star Trek: Voyager

See also
Parys (name), given name and surname

References